Christiane Schenderlein (born 17 October 1981) is a German politician of the Christian Democratic Union (CDU) who has been serving as a member of the Bundestag since 2021.

Early life and education
Schenderlein was born 1981 in the East German town of Weißenfels.

Political career
Schenderlein became member of the Landtag of Saxony in 2019. 

In the Bundestag, Schenderlein is her parliamentary group’s spokesperson for cultural affairs and media.

Other activities
 Stiftung Archiv der Parteien und Massenorganisationen der DDR (SAPMO), Member of the Board of Trustees (since 2022)

References 

Living people
1981 births
People from Weißenfels
Christian Democratic Union of Germany politicians
Members of the Bundestag 2021–2025
21st-century German politicians